Matty Pattison (born 27 October 1986) is a South African former footballer and current head of youth development at Whickham.

Early life
Pattison, who was born in Johannesburg, began to play football at an early age. He and his family then moved to England in 1997, when he was eleven years old. He joined Newcastle Youth Academy at the age of fourteen.

Club career

Newcastle United
He got his first taste of senior football in a pre-season friendly match against Celtic in August 2004. Unfortunately, Pattison was put on the sideline for the whole 2004–05 season with two knee ligament injuries that threatened to end his career. However, he showed his resilience and made his competitive first team debut on 25 February 2006 in a Premier League match against Everton, coming on as a substitute. Pattison made his first start for the club later in the same season against West Bromwich Albion, before being substituted after 80 minutes. Pattison was later named man of the match for the impressive contribution he made during the 3–0 win.

Norwich City
Pattison joined Norwich City for a short loan period in November 2007, following ex-manager Glenn Roeder. After making 10 appearances and impressing, the deal was made permanent once the transfer window opened on 4 January 2008 for an undisclosed fee, on a three and a half-year contract. In a bizarre incident, it was reported on 19 March, that Pattison had been arrested by police after being caught not only drink-driving, but doing so whilst only wearing underwear.
However it was revealed during his resulting court case that he was fully clothed at the time of his arrest.

Pattison did not score during his first year with Norwich City, despite striking the goal frame on a number of occasions. His first goal finally came in the 2–1 win at Nottingham Forest on 22 November 2008, and was quickly followed up with another against Crystal Palace three days later. He then scored the second goal against local rivals Ipswich Town on 7 December to take his tally to three in four games.

Mamelodi Sundowns
On 3 August 2009 Pattison was reported by South African media to be leaving Norwich to play in South Africa, either for Mamelodi Sundowns or Orlando Pirates. On 6 August Pattison returned to his native South Africa to join Mamelodi Sundowns for an undisclosed fee in hope of breaking into the South African national team for the 2010 FIFA World Cup in South Africa.

Matty was on trial at Championship side Leeds United and had scored two goals in two friendly games, putting in some hard working performances in his quest to secure a permanent move back to English football. Leeds saw Matty as a potential solution to their midfield problems following the sale of Jonny Howson. On 27 January 2012 Leeds United Manager Simon Grayson said he would not be offering Matty a deal at the club. Matty also had a trial with Scottish club Hibernian in January 2012 but eventually, he signed a six-month deal with Engen Santos on 31 January 2012.

On 1 May 2012, Matty departed from Santos prior to the expiration of the contract. After parting ways with Santos, on 3 June 2012, it was announced that Matty would join South African club Bidvest Wits.

Gateshead
On 3 October 2014, Pattison signed for Conference Premier club Gateshead until the end of the 2014–15 season, subject to international clearance. He made his debut on 11 October in a 1–1 draw with Forest Green Rovers. He scored his first goal for Gateshead on 11 November in a 3–3 draw with Lincoln City. After two seasons with the club, Pattison was released by Gateshead in May 2016.

South Shields
On 24 May 2017, Pattison signed for Northern League club South Shields on a free transfer from Blyth Spartans.

Whickham
At the beginning of the 2018–19 season, the former South African International moved to Whickham and was named manager in November 2019.

Return to Gateshead
After leaving Whickham in February 2020, Pattison was added to the first team squad at Gateshead, where he had been named Academy Coach whilst at Whickham.

Dunston UTS 
On 19th August 2021, Pattison signed for Northern Premier League Division One East club Dunston UTS. He made his debut on 21 August coming off of the bench against Newcastle Benfield in a 2-1 win in the FA Cup Preliminary Round.

Pattison made his final appearance for Dunston UTS after a substitute appearance in a 2-2 draw against Bamber Bridge in the FA Trophy Third Qualifying Round, on 30th October 2021.

On 20th November 2021, Matty Pattison announced his decision to end his playing career in football.

International career
Although having been called up to the senior squad several times, Pattison was first capped for South Africa off the bench against the US in November 2010. Pattison was selected for the nation's 2010 FIFA World Cup 29-man squad for a training camp in Durban from 15 to 28 January 2010, playing in an unofficial friendly match against Swaziland.

Pattison came off the bench to win his second cap against Kenya in February 2011. He was later called up as a late replacement for the injured Jabulani Shongwe in the 2014 African Nations Championship. He came off the bench against Mozambique on 11 January to win his third cap

Non-playing career 
On 17 January 2022, Pattison was announced as a lead coach for i2i Soccer Academy.

On 8 June 2022, Pattison was also announced as head of youth development at Whickham FC.

Awards
Nedbank Cup Player of the Tournament: 2010

References

External links

https://web.archive.org/web/20090822023350/http://www.football365.co.za/player/0,25236,14311_180855,00.html

1986 births
Living people
Sportspeople from Johannesburg
South African people of English descent
White South African people
Association football midfielders
South African soccer players
South African expatriate soccer players
South African expatriate sportspeople in England
Expatriate footballers in England
Newcastle United F.C. players
Norwich City F.C. players
Mamelodi Sundowns F.C. players
Santos F.C. (South Africa) players
Bidvest Wits F.C. players
Gateshead F.C. players
Blyth Spartans A.F.C. players
South Shields F.C. (1974) players
Whickham F.C. players
Premier League players
English Football League players
National League (English football) players
Northern Premier League players
Northern Football League players
South Africa international soccer players